Madison Prespakis (born 2 November 2000) is an Australian rules footballer playing for the Essendon Football Club in the AFL Women's (AFLW). She previously played for the Carlton Football Club from 2019 to 2022. A midfielder who won multiple accolades at junior level and played in the VFL Women's (VFLW) as a teenager, Prespakis won the 2019 AFL Women's Rising Star award in her debut season and the 2020 AFL Women's best and fairest award in her second season. She is a three-time AFL Women's All-Australian, three-time Carlton best and fairest winner and was the inaugural Essendon best and fairest winner in season seven, and is Essendon's equal games record holder with ten games.

Early life
Prespakis is the daughter of Damien and Jody. Her mother is an Indigenous Australian from the Djadjawurrung tribe. Prespakis has three siblings: twin sister Annalea, Georgie and Jimmy; She attended Gisborne Secondary College and supported  growing up.
Prespakis began playing football at four years old through the Auskick program in Romsey, north-west of Melbourne. She played in boys' teams at first, before representing the under-15 Sunbury girls side.

In 2017, Prespakis played in the premiership-winning Calder Cannons side in the TAC Cup Girls. She was named in the league's team of the year and placed second in the league's best and fairest with 20 votes. She competed at the 2017 AFL Women's Under 18 Championships for Vic Metro and was named in the All-Australian squad. In October, Prespakis was named in the 2018 AFLW Academy squad as one of twenty-nine seventeen-year-old prospects.

In 2018, Prespakis became captain of the Calder Cannons and won their best and fairest award with 113 out of a possible 120 votes. She was again named in the TAC Cup Girls Team of the Year and tied with Nina Morrison for the league best and fairest. She again competed at the 2018 AFL Women's Under 18 Championships; she shared the competition's most valuable player award with Morrison on 16 votes apiece, won Vic Metro's most valuable player award and was named in the All-Australian side. She played in an exhibition game for Victoria, acting as a curtain raiser for the E. J. Whitten Legends Game. Prespakis amassed 21 disposals in Victoria's win, the most of any player.

Ahead of the 2018 AFL Women's draft, Prespakis was widely predicted to be taken with one of the first selections. Prospective draftees were required to nominate a state or region they wished to play in; Prespakis selected the Melbourne metropolitan area, citing a wish to remain home with her family. This prevented  from recruiting her with pick one or two and allowed Carlton the opportunity to select her with pick three.

AFL Women's career

Carlton (2019–2022)

Carlton recruited Prespakis with their first selection and third overall in the 2018 AFL Women's draft. She made her AFL Women's debut in the opening round of the 2019 season against  at North Hobart Oval. The following round, she was nominated for the 2019 AFL Women's Rising Star award after kicking one goal and amassing 20 disposals, seven clearances and nine contested possessions against . Prespakis went on to play in the 2019 AFL Women's Grand Final loss to Adelaide in front of a record AFL Women's crowd, and was among Carlton's best players. Following a debut season in which she averaged 19 disposals and kicked seven goals across nine games, Prespakis won the 2019 AFL Women's Rising Star award with 49 votes and was named in the 2019 AFL Women's All-Australian team. She also won the AFLW Players' best first-year player award and tied for the Carlton best and fairest award with captain Brianna Davey, capping off a memorable first season.

Leading into the 2020 season, womens.afl journalist Sarah Black named Prespakis at no. 23 on her list of the top 30 players in the AFLW. She was selected in womens.afls Team of the Week in rounds 1, 3 and 6, and tied with North Melbourne's Jasmine Garner and 's Karen Paxman as womens.afls player of the year. Prespakis was selected in the 2020 AFL Women's All-Australian team, and was also selected as vice-captain in the AFL Players Association's inaugural AFL Women's 22under22 team, having earlier been selected in the retrospective 2017–2019 team. She went on to win her second Carlton best and fairest award, after coming second in voting for the AFLW Players' most valuable player award for that season, and capped off her season by winning the 2020 AFL Women's best and fairest award with 15 votes, at just 19 years of age; in doing so, she became the first indigenous player to win the award. She later said that she had turned to Carlton AFL co-captain Patrick Cripps at times during the season for advice on how to deal with taggers.

Leading into the 2021 season, Sarah Black named Prespakis at no. 1 on her annual list of the top 30 players in the AFLW. Prespakis was best afield in Carlton's win against  in round 3, recording 24 disposals and a goal, and was selected in womens.afls Team of the Week for that round. She was again among the best afield the following week against  with 19 disposals and two goals, and was again selected in womens.afls Team of the Week, but was cited for a dangerous tackle on former teammate Sarah Hosking, which eventuated in a one-match suspension. Prespakis attempted to overturn the suspension at the AFL Tribunal but was unsuccessful, ruling her out of the competition's inaugural indigenous round and meaning she would be ineligible for that year's AFL Women's best and fairest award. She was best afield upon her return against  in round 6 with 27 disposals and a goal, despite injuring her left elbow in the first quarter, and again won selection in womens.afls Team of the Week.

Prespakis was named at no. 17 in Sarah Black's 2022 list of the top 30 players in the AFLW.

Essendon (2022–present)
In April 2022, Prespakis and teammate Georgia Gee accepted deals to join 's inaugural AFLW team, with both signing on the opening day of the expansion signing period in May.

Statistics
Updated to the end of S7 (2022).

|-
| 2019 ||  || 4
| 9 || 7 || 3 || 113 || 59 || 172 || 17 || 28 || 0.8 || 0.3 || 12.6 || 6.6 || 19.1 || 1.9 || 3.1 || 5
|-
| 2020 ||  || 4
| 7 || 3 || 3 || 88 || 61 || 149 || 19 || 21 || 0.4 || 0.4 || 12.6 || 8.7 || 21.3 || 2.7 || 3.0 || bgcolor=98FB98 | 15±
|-
| 2021 ||  || 4
| 8 || 4 || 4 || 79 || 90 || 169 || 13 || 33 || 0.5 || 0.5 || 9.9 || 11.3 || 21.1 || 1.6 || 4.1 || 10
|-
| 2022 ||  || 4
| 10 || 1 || 2 || 90 || 115 || 205 || 24 || 35 || 0.1 || 0.2 || 9.0 || 11.5 || 20.5 || 2.4 || 3.5 || 7
|-
| S7 (2022) ||  || 4
| 10 || 6 || 3 || 119 || 118 || 237 || 22 || 49 || 0.6 || 0.3 || 11.9 || 11.8 || 23.7 || 2.2 || 4.9 || 17
|- class=sortbottom
! colspan=3 | Career
! 43 !! 21 !! 15 !! 489 !! 443 !! 932 !! 95 !! 166 !! 0.5 !! 0.3 !! 11.1 !! 10.1 !! 21.2 !! 2.2 !! 3.8 !! 54
|}

Personal life
Prespakis also dated current  player Serene Watson.

Honours and achievements
 AFL Women's best and fairest: 2020
 Essendon equal games record holder
 3× AFL Women's All-Australian team: 2019, 2020, S7
 3× Carlton best and fairest: 2019, 2020, 2022
 Essendon best and fairest: S7
 AFL Women's Rising Star: 2019
 AFLPA AFLW best first-year player: 2019
 3× AFL Women's 22under22 team: 2020 (vc), 2021 (vc), 2022 (vc)
 AFL Women's 2017–2019 22under22 team

References

External links

 
 
 

2000 births
Living people
Indigenous Australian players of Australian rules football
Australian rules footballers from Victoria (Australia)
Calder Cannons players
Carlton Football Club (AFLW) players
Essendon Football Club (AFLW) players
Melbourne University Football Club (VFLW) players
Calder Cannons players (NAB League Girls)
Lesbian sportswomen
Australian LGBT sportspeople
LGBT players of Australian rules football
Australian people of Greek descent